The Cayo Agua Formation is a geologic formation in Panama. It preserves fossils dating back to the Pliocene period.

Fossil content 
 Aphera trophis
 Cancellaria axelolssoni, C. isabelae
 Diaphus depressifrons
 Umbrina bananensis, U. sublima

See also 
 List of fossiliferous stratigraphic units in Panama

References

Bibliography 
 
 
 

Geologic formations of Panama
Neogene Panama
Paleontology in Panama
Sandstone formations
Shallow marine deposits
Formations